General Maurin may refer to:

Antoine Maurin (1771–1830), French cavalry general of division
Jean Maurin (born 1959), French Army general of division
Louis Maurin (1869–1956), French Army general